Janine Deakin is a professor at the University of Canberra and Executive Dean of the Faculty of Science and Technology. She is a geneticist with expertise in the areas of comparative genomics, epigenetics, genetic immunology and genome structure and regulation. A majority of her work has focused on the Australian marsupials and monotremes where her cytogenetic and molecular research on marsupial chromosomes and development of strategies to map genomes has provided important insight into the evolution of mammalian genomes.

Early life and education
Deakin was born in Sydney, New South Wales in 1971. She attended Our Lady of the Rosary Primary School, Waitara and Mt St Benedict Girls’ High School, Pennant Hills.

She received her BSc(Honours) in 1994 at Macquarie University in Sydney. She then completed her PhD in Biology at Macquarie University in 1998 entitled “Immunology of mother-pouch young relationships in the brushtail possum, Trichosurus vulpecula”. This investigated the possibility of controlling possums in New Zealand by sterilizing the pouch young via the mother's immune response to a molecule important to sex differentiation. She found however that this approach to possum control was unlikely to be effective due to the high level of non-responders to any antigen among possums.

Career
In 1998 Deakin moved to San Antonio, Texas to conduct postdoctoral research at the University of Texas Health Science Center. She studied the effects of glucorticoids on aging using “knock-in” mice (1998-2000).

She returned to Australia in 2001 as a postdoctoral fellow in the Evolution, Ecology and Genetics Division at the Australian National University, Canberra, which developed into a research fellow position with Prof Jenny Graves. This research (2001-2011) was focused on investigating questions in marsupial and monotreme genomics, particularly in the areas of cytogenetics, immunogenetics, epigenetics and genome evolution.

She was involved in the ARC Centre of Excellence for Kangaroo Genomics (2004-2010) and lead the ANU team constructing the physical map of the tammar wallaby (Macropus eugeneii) genome.

Deakin was awarded an ARC Future Fellow in 2010 to study the evolution of devil facial tumour disease. She took this fellowship from the Australian National University to the University of Canberra, where she became an associate professor in 2012.

She received an ARC discovery grant (2010-2012) “Epigenetic silencing in vertebrates: evolution and function from the bottom-up.” In addition to her epigenetic work on marsupials she was also awarded a postdoctoral fellowship (2012-2015) from the University of Canberra to explore comparative epigenomics in amniotes.

Deakin has been editor for the Australian Journal of Zoology and AIMS Genetics. She was also lead editor on the book “Marsupial Genetics and Genomics” in 2010 combining 23 different chapters highlighting the various current marsupial research.

Final notes
Deakin has progressed our understanding of Australian marsupial and mammal genetics as well as epigenetics in non-model organisms (e.g.) and has integrated her research on native species with the broader community through media outreach to create awareness for conservation.

References

Living people
Australian geneticists
Year of birth missing (living people)
Academic staff of the University of Canberra
Scientists from Sydney
Macquarie University alumni